Swynnerton is a village and civil parish in Staffordshire, England. It lies in the Borough of Stafford, and at the 2001 census had a population of 4,233, increasing to 4,453 at the 2011 Census.

Swynnerton is listed in the Domesday Book identifying the lord in 1066 as Brothir (of Oaken) and in 1086, Edelo (of Rauceby), who was in service to Robert de Stafford, the tenant-in-chief. The record shows the settlement consisted of ten villagers' households, and five smallholders. Property consisted of eight ploughlands suitable for one lord's plough teams, and six men's plough teams. Other resources are listed as ten acres of meadow, and one league of woodland. The owner's value was estimated at £2.

St Mary's Church dates back to at least the 13th century, and as far back as the 11th century. Swynnerton received its charter from Edward I in 1306. During the 14th century a market used to be held every Wednesday and an annual fair was held on 15 August each year.

A grand manor house used to exist until its destruction in the English Civil War by Cromwell's men, its replacement being Swynnerton Hall, built in 1725 by Francis Smith of Warwick, which still dominates the Swynnerton skyline today. The Roman Catholic church of Our Lady adjoins the hall, which was built in 1868 by Gilbert Blount. Most of the houses in the village are post World War II.

Nearby Cold Meece houses a British Army training area that used to be a Royal Ordnance Factory, ROF Swynnerton. It is often used by the Air Training Corps and the Army Cadet Force, but is also a regular training area for the British Army.  During the war, the factory was served by Cold Meece railway station.

Yarnfield and Cold Meece civil parish and parish council came into being in April 2019, with two wards, Yarnfield and Cold Meece.  It is included in the Borough of Stafford, and was previously the southern part of Swynnerton parish.

The village pub, the Fitzherbert Arms, has three bars, two dining areas and accommodation.

Transport
D&G Bus service number 14 calls at the church bus stop five times a day on its way to and from Hanley, Trentham, Barlaston, Stone, Eccleshall and Stafford.

Swynnerton is directly connected to Eccleshall by the Swynnerton Road. It is also a 10 minute drive from Stone and Meaford via the A51. The nearest city is Stoke-on-Trent, a 15 minute drive via the A51 and A34 roads.

Notable residents
 Thomas Fitzherbert (1552–1640) was an English Jesuit, born at Swynnerton. His father died whilst he was an infant and he was the head of an important family.
 Lord Stafford's family presence dates back several centuries.
 Henry Wadsworth Longfellow (1807–1882) is believed to have penned his famous poem, The Village Blacksmith, in Swynnerton.

Nearby locations
Eccleshall
Meaford
Stafford
Stoke-on-Trent
Stone
Tittensor
Yarnfield

See also
Listed buildings in Swynnerton

References

External links

  Swynnerton Parish Council Website
  Swinnerton / Swynnerton Family web pages
 Our Lady Parish Church web pages
 Website of Potteries.org - Neville Malkin's "Grand Tour" of the Potteries Retrieved Feb 2017 = Has several old pictures, drawings and historical narrative about St. Mary's Church, Swynnerton

Villages in Staffordshire
Borough of Stafford